The 2013 Notre Dame Fighting Irish football team represented the University of Notre Dame in the 2013 NCAA Division I FBS football season. The team was coached by Brian Kelly and played its home games at Notre Dame Stadium in South Bend, Indiana. They competed as an independent.

All wins in the 2012 and 2013 seasons and Notre Dame's loss in the 2012 BCS National Championship Game were later vacated for use of ineligible players.

Before the season

Previous season
The Fighting Irish finished the 2012 regular season 12–0. They lost to the University of Alabama 42–14 in the 2012 BCS National Championship Game.

2013 NFL draft
The following former Notre Dame players were selected in the 2013 NFL Draft:

Transfers out / departures
On March 8, 2013, after only one year with the program, reserve quarterback Gunner Kiel announced he would transfer from the university. Sophomore wide receiver Davonte Neal left the team in late March, citing a desire to be closer to home. The day after Davonte Neal decided to transfer from Notre Dame, fellow wide receiver sophomore Justin Ferguson announced he was transferring as well and confirmed by coach Brian Kelly at a news conference. On May 28, 2013, it was announced that starting quarterback Everett Golson is no longer enrolled at the university, and was suspended from the school for the fall semester due to an academic violation. Chris Badger departs back home to Provo, Utah and will transfer to BYU due to family illness and will appeal for waiver to play this season.

Transfers in
Alex Wulfeck, a specialist at Wake Forest, announced he would transfer to Notre Dame in May after he received his degree in May 2013. He would be enrolled in a graduate studies program while exhausting his final season of eligibility.

Coaching changes
There were no staff changes following the 2012 season. The only "change" is that Brian Kelly turned play calling duties over to Chuck Martin.

Recruiting class
Brian Kelly received 24 commitments in his third full recruiting class including four five-star recruits: outside linebacker Jaylon Smith, defensive tackle Eddie Vanderdoes, running back Greg Bryant, and defensive back Max Redfield. Vanderdoes would later decommit to play at UCLA, citing family health issues required that he be closer to home.

Personnel

Coaching staff

Roster

Schedule

‡Former NCAA Attendance Record (September 7, 2013 – September 10, 2016)

Game summaries

Temple

Michigan

Following its game against Temple, Notre Dame played the Michigan Wolverines in Ann Arbor. Notre Dame won the previous meeting 13–6. Billed as "Under the Lights II", this was the second night game in Michigan Stadium's history; the previous game also featured Notre Dame. Tom Harmon was honored as a Michigan Football Legends, and his #98 jersey was unretired and given to quarterback Devin Gardner.

Michigan won the game, 41–30. The game attendance of 115,109 was the largest crowd ever to watch a college football game.  Quarterback Devin Gardner completed 21 of 33 passes for 294 yards and four touchdowns while throwing one interception. Gardner has also rushed for 134 yards and three rushing touchdowns in the first two games of the season.  Gardner contributed 376 yards of total offense against Notre Dame ranks as the tenth best performance in Michigan history, as reflected in the following list.  The only two Michigan players to contribute more total yards in a single game are Denard Robinson and John Navarre. Wide receiver Jeremy Gallon caught eight passes for 184 yards and three touchdowns and rushed for 14 yards. Gallon's 184 receiving yards against Notre Dame is tied for the sixth highest single-game performance in Michigan history.  On defense, cornerback Blake Countess had two interceptions for Michigan.

References to chickens were a widely reported side story to the game. After Notre Dame announced one year earlier that it would terminate the rivalry after the 2014 season, Michigan head coach Brady Hoke said Notre Dame was "chickening out". When ESPN commentator Lee Corso made his pick for the game during the College GameDay show (which was in Ann Arbor for the game), he brought out a live chicken, and fans in the background carried signs with poultry references, including "Cluck of the Irish."    At the end Michigan's 41–30 victory, in what Chantel Jennings of ESPN.com called the "Dig of the Day", the speakers at Michigan Stadium loudly played the "Chicken Dance" as Michigan fans "danced in the stands."

The win made Michigan favorites in the Big Ten Conference.

Purdue

Michigan State

Oklahoma

Arizona State

USC

1st quarter scoring: USC – Silas Redd 1-yard run (Andre Heidari kick); ND – Troy Niklas 7-yard pass from Tommy Rees (Kyle Brindza kick)

2nd quarter scoring: USC – Heidari 22-yard field goal; ND – TJ Jones 11-yard pass from Rees (Brindza kick)

Air Force

Navy

Pittsburgh

Although Notre Dame's sports teams have joined the Atlantic Coast Conference (which Pittsburgh has also joined), the Panthers will be the only ACC team on Notre Dame's football schedule this year, as the agreement to play five ACC teams each year does not begin until 2014.

BYU

Stanford

Rutgers (Pinstripe Bowl)

Rankings

Postseason

Awards

NCAA sanctions
In 2018, an investigation was launched that found Notre Dame had used ineligible players during the 2012 and 2013 seasons. As a result, Notre Dame was forced to vacate all wins from the 2012 and 2013 seasons as a punishment from the NCAA, which includes their signature win in the Pinstripe Bowl against 6-7 Rutgers.

References

Notre Dame
Notre Dame Fighting Irish football seasons
Pinstripe Bowl champion seasons
Notre Dame Fighting Irish football